The 2016 Italian Grand Prix (formally known as the Formula 1 Gran Premio Heineken d'Italia 2016) was a Formula One motor race held on 4 September 2016 at the Autodromo Nazionale di Monza in Monza, Italy. It was the fourteenth round of the 2016 FIA Formula One World Championship, and marked the 86th running of the Italian Grand Prix and the 81st time the race was held at Monza.

Mercedes driver and winner of the previous year's race, Lewis Hamilton, entered the race leading the World Drivers' Championship by nine points ahead of teammate Nico Rosberg. In the World Constructors' Championship, Mercedes held a lead of 181 points. Red Bull Racing was placed second and Ferrari third.

Background

Tyres
Pirelli provided the teams with medium, soft and supersoft tyres. Pirelli anticipated that the difference between the different compounds would be less than one second per lap, with the differences between soft and supersoft to be around 0.7 of a second, and the difference between soft and medium about 0.9 seconds.

Qualifying

Notes
 – Romain Grosjean and Esteban Ocon received a five-place grid penalty for an unscheduled gearbox change.
 – Esteban Ocon failed to set a lap time in qualifying. His participation in the race was at the discretion of the stewards.

Race
Lewis Hamilton started poorly and was overtaken by his teammate Nico Rosberg, Sebastian Vettel, Kimi Räikkönen, Valtteri Bottas and Daniel Ricciardo. Rosberg went into a comfortable lead with Hamilton slowly recovering, firstly picking off Ricciardo then Bottas shortly afterwards. Hamilton didn't have the pace or tyres to catch his teammate Rosberg who went on to win the race. Sebastian Vettel finished third ahead of his Ferrari teammate Räikkönen. Ricciardo took 5th ahead of Bottas.

Race classification 

Notes
 – Daniil Kvyat received a 5-second time penalty for speeding in the pit-lane, which was added to his finishing time (despite his being retired and not classified in the race).
 – Felipe Nasr received a 10-second penalty for causing a collision with Jolyon Palmer, which, unlike Kvyat's penalty, was not added to his finishing time.

Championship standings after the race

Drivers' Championship standings

Constructors' Championship standings

 Note: Only the top five positions are included for both sets of standings.

See also 
 2016 Monza GP2 Series round
 2016 Monza GP3 Series round

References

External links

Italian
Grand Prix
Italian Grand Prix
Italian Grand Prix